Armando Lenin Wila Canga (born 12 May 1985) is an Ecuadorian footballer currently playing for LDU Portoviejo.

Club career
Wila started his career at Deportivo Cuenca. With just one appearance for Cuenca, he was loaned out to many other clubs. In 2009, Wila was loaned out to Técnico Universitario where he has had the most success in his career. Currently, he is the team's second goalscorer after Omar Guerra with 6 goals.

In July 2009, in a game against ESPOLI, Wila was banned out of football for three months after he chested and argued with the referee about a play which got him a red card.

It was confirmed that Wila would be joining Barcelona for the 2015 Serie A.

In 2015, Wila joined Saudi Professional League side Al-Nassr FC.

In February 2019, Wila joined LDU Portoviejo alongside his older brother Polo Wila.

International career
Wila was called up for an unofficial friendly on April 23, 2014 against the Serie A Rest of the World team composed of foreigners. He scored his 1st goal for Ecuador in this very same game. Ecuador went on to win the match 2-1. Wila made his "Official" debut for Ecuador against Netherlands on May 17, 2014. He was subbed out during the 2nd half due to an injury for Fidel Martínez.

Statistics 

As of 15 May 2015

Honours

Club 
 Al-Nassr
 Saudi Professional League (1): 2014-15

References

External links
 
 

1985 births
Living people
People from San Lorenzo, Ecuador
Association football forwards
Ecuadorian footballers
C.D. Cuenca footballers
C.D. Técnico Universitario footballers
C.S.D. Independiente del Valle footballers
Barcelona S.C. footballers
Club Puebla players
L.D.U. Loja footballers
C.D. Universidad Católica del Ecuador footballers
Al Nassr FC players
Fuerza Amarilla S.C. footballers
Unión Comercio footballers
L.D.U. Portoviejo footballers
Ecuadorian Serie A players
Liga MX players
Saudi Professional League players
Peruvian Primera División players
Ecuadorian expatriate footballers
Expatriate footballers in Mexico
Expatriate footballers in Saudi Arabia